Bulborrhizina is a genus of lichenized fungi in the family Parmeliaceae. The genus is monotypic, containing the single species Bulborrhizina africana, found in Mozambique.

See also
List of Parmeliaceae genera

References

Parmeliaceae
Lichen genera
Lecanorales genera
Taxa described in 1994
Taxa named by Syo Kurokawa